Fairfax is the primary village and a census-designated place (CDP) in the town of Fairfax, Franklin County, Vermont, United States. As of the 2020 census it had a population of 865, out of 5,014 in the entire town of Fairfax.

The CDP is in southern Franklin County, in the south part of the town of Bakersfield. It sits on the north side of the Lamoille River, a west-flowing tributary of Lake Champlain. Vermont Route 104 is the village's Main Street; it leads northwest  to St. Albans and southeast  to Cambridge.

References 

Populated places in Franklin County, Vermont
Census-designated places in Franklin County, Vermont
Census-designated places in Vermont